Mafa is an Afro-Asiatic language spoken in northern Cameroon and Northern Nigeria by the Mafa people.

The term Matakam is traditionally seen as pejorative.

Dialects
Mafa is widely spoken in the department of Mayo-Tsanaga from Mokolo to the north. Mafa includes the following dialects.

Central Mafa in Koza commune and in Mokolo town
West Mafa in the northwest of Mokolo Commune (Magoumaz)
East Mafa in the northeast (Soulede and Roua communes)

There are 136,000 speakers in Cameroon.

Phonology

Vowels

Consonants 

 /ᵑɡ/ is heard as a velar nasal [ŋ] when in word-final position.

Notes 

Biu-Mandara languages
Languages of Cameroon
Languages of Nigeria